Crivitz School District is a public school district in Crivitz, Wisconsin, United States. It opened a new Crivitz High School in the fall of 1998 which its athletic teams are nicknamed the Wolverines and bear the colors blue and gold.

References

External links 
 

Education in Marinette County, Wisconsin
School districts in Wisconsin